Silvana Santaella Arellano (born September 29, 1983 in Caracas, Venezuela) is a Venezuelan model and beauty pageant titleholder.

On October 16, 2003, Santaella competed in the national beauty pageant Miss Venezuela 2003, held in Caracas, where she placed 1st runner-up. She then won Miss Italia nel Mondo 2004.

She was crowned Sambil Model / Miss Earth Venezuela 2007 on June 7, 2007 in Caracas, by Marianne Puglia, Miss Earth-Fire 2006, and Alexandra Braun, Miss Earth 2005, and represented Venezuela at Miss Earth 2007, in which she was crowned Miss Earth-Water (2nd runner-up). The pageant was won by Canadian Jessica Trisko.

References

External links
 Sambil Models official website
 Miss Earth official website
 Miss Italia nel Mondo official website

Living people
1983 births
People from Caracas
Venezuelan people of Italian descent
Miss Earth 2007 contestants
Venezuelan beauty pageant winners